Víctor Manuel Jorrín Lozano (born 13 January 1955) is a Mexican politician and psychiatrist affiliated with the Convergence. He currently serves as Deputy of the LXII Legislature of the Mexican Congress representing Guerrero.

References

1955 births
Living people
Politicians from Guerrero
Mexican psychiatrists
Citizens' Movement (Mexico) politicians
21st-century Mexican politicians
Deputies of the LXII Legislature of Mexico
Members of the Chamber of Deputies (Mexico) for Guerrero